Muhammed Ali Khan was a prince and general of the Mughal Empire. Khan rescued the Grand Vizier Mir Mohib Ali Khalifa from enemy attacks at the Battle of Khanwa.

References

See also
Mughal Empire
Babur

Mughal Empire
Date of birth missing
Date of death missing